White Fang is a 2018 French-Luxembourgish computer-animated film directed by Alexandre Espigares. Based on the 1906 book of the same name by Jack London, the film features the voices of Nick Offerman, Rashida Jones, Paul Giamatti, and Eddie Spears as natives of Alaska who, at different times, come to know White Fang, a free spirited and at times violent wolfdog who eventually bonds with Offerman's character, a gentle master named Weedon Scott. The film also features Dave Boat, Daniel Hagen, and Stephen Kramer Glickman in the original English version, and Virginie Efira, Raphaël Personnaz, and Dominique Pinon in the French dub.

The film premiered at Sundance Film Festival in January 2018. After a limited theatrical run in France and the United States, Netflix acquired the film and released it later that year, on July 6, 2018. The film received positive reviews from critics and audiences. During its theatrical run, White Fang grossed $7.8 million worldwide.

Plot

A young wolfdog pup gets separated from his mother, Kiche, and embarks on a journey of self discovery. He is given the name White Fang by a tribe of Native Americans, who enlist him as a sled-pulling dog. After he is unable to pull sleds anymore, he is sold to a Native American man, who loses him in a gambling bet to Beauty Smith, a cruel master who forces White Fang into dogfighting. He is saved by Marshall Weedon Scott, who bonds with him before eventually setting him free.

Voice cast
Nick Offerman as Marshal Weedon Scott
Rashida Jones as Maggie Scott
Paul Giamatti as Beauty Smith
Eddie Spears as Grey Beaver
Dave Boat as Jim Hall
Sean Kenin as Bookie
Raquel Antonia as Vichi
Daniel Hagen as Marshal Todd
Stephen Kramer Glickman as Ned
William Calvert as William
Jason Grasl as Three Eagles
Armando Riesco as Curtis

Reception
The film received mostly positive reviews from critics and audiences.  

Guy Lodge of Variety called it a "a visually marvelous, dramatically uneven spin" on the source material, writing that, "close canine sympathy is one thing this kind-hearted, beautifully conceived but, well, slightly toothless 'White Fang' gets right throughout." Lodge criticized the film's pacing, voice acting, and lack of personality, but praised its animation and artistic style, and felt that it was an enjoyable movie for its target demographic of young children. Kate Erbland of IndieWire gave the film a B grade, wrote that it "offers up warm-hearted charms and often stunning animation", praising its animation and message.

Awards and accolades

References

External links
 
 

2018 films
2018 computer-animated films
2010s children's animated films
French animated films
French children's films
2010s French-language films
Animated films about friendship
Films based on White Fang
2010s English-language films
2010s French films